André Willms (born 18 September 1972 in Burg bei Magdeburg) is a retired German rower. During his career Willms became a double Olympic champion and five-time world champion.

References

Rowers at the 1992 Summer Olympics
Rowers at the 1996 Summer Olympics
Rowers at the 2000 Summer Olympics
Rowers at the 2004 Summer Olympics
Olympic rowers of Germany
Olympic gold medalists for Germany
Olympic bronze medalists for Germany
1972 births
Living people
Olympic medalists in rowing
German male rowers
Medalists at the 2000 Summer Olympics
Medalists at the 1996 Summer Olympics
Medalists at the 1992 Summer Olympics
World Rowing Championships medalists for Germany
People from Jerichower Land
Sportspeople from Saxony-Anhalt